Rossburn is an unincorporated urban community in the Rossburn Municipality, Manitoba. Prior to 1 January 2015, Rossburn was designated as a town. It is near Waywayseecappo First Nation. There is an elementary school and a collegiate school.

Rossburn is also home to Brandon Wheat Kings player Chad Nychuk who was deemed the name “The Rossburn Rifle” after scoring multiple game winning goals as a 20 year old. Chad became a fan favourite in the Westman area and you can find his face on shirts around the area. “The rifle” was born and raised in Rossburn and put it on the map.

Demographics 

References 

Designated places in Manitoba
Unincorporated communities in Parkland Region, Manitoba
Unincorporated urban communities in Manitoba
Former towns in Manitoba
Populated places disestablished in 2015